I Remember Me (2000) is a biographical documentary about chronic fatigue syndrome, filmed in the United States by Kim A. Snyder. The film attempts to show just how devastating the illness can be to afflicted persons.

Snyder's travels are chronicled for four years as she tries to find answers about the mysterious illness with which she was diagnosed. The motivation for Snyder was her fluctuating partial improvements followed by relapses of debilitating symptoms she experienced. Snyder was given many contradictory diagnoses for her symptoms along with various drugs that were of no help to her.

The movie explains that there are medical experts who refuse to believe the illness exists, and among those that do, no one knows what causes it, how a person acquires it, or how it may be cured.

Snyder's movie researches the history of the disease which takes her to Florida where a cluster outbreak occurred in 1956, and to Lake Tahoe Nevada where many people became ill in the mid-1980s. The Florida victims were women who were "described in a medical journal as having hysterical paralysis." She interviewed several of the women who became ill and later recovered. A group still meets to discuss their experiences with the illness. The Nevada group was a severe outbreak and Snyder interviewed treating doctor Daniel Peterson along with several of his patients. Peterson describes how the Centers for Disease Control investigated, but he does not believe that they intended to take the illness seriously. Peterson takes the illness very seriously, and seven of his patients have died by suicide.

Several other notable individuals with Chronic fatigue syndrome are interviewed, and they clearly express their lengthy "excruciating misery" in battling the illness. The interviews included movie director Blake Edwards, United States Olympic soccer gold medalist Michelle Akers, and a high school senior in Connecticut, bedridden for two years who is transported by ambulance to his high school graduation.

Snyder thoroughly investigates the illness, but by the end of the movie few of the answers she sought at the beginning of her quest have been found.

Snyder is a New York-based filmmaker who has worked widely on not-for-profit projects in the film world. Kim was struck down with CFIDS (Chronic Fatigue Immune Dysfunction Syndrome) in the mid-1990s while working as an assistant producer with Jodie Foster on Home For the Holidays.

Cast

Listed by the Internet Movie Database:
  
Kim A. Snyder ...  Narrator
Michelle Akers ...  Herself
Jan Armstrong ...  Himself - local pastor, Truckee / Tahoe, NV
Faye Austin ...  Herself - patient, Punta Gorda, FL
Gussie Baker ...  Herself - patient, Punta Gorda, FL
David Bell M.D. ...  Himself - physician, Lyndonville, NY
Kelly Blank ...  Herself - relative of a patient
Blake Edwards ...  Himself - patient
D.A. Henderson M.D. ...  Himself - researcher, Johns Hopkins
David Hyde M.D. ...  Himself - physician
Jay Levy M.D. ...  Himself - immunologist
Frances Malone ...  Herself - patient, Punta Gorda, FL
Peter Manu M.D. ...  Himself - psychiatrist
Pat McCloud ...  Herself - a patient
Martha McCormick ...  Herself - patient, Punta Gorda, FL
Stephen Paganetti ...  Himself - patient, Durham, CT
Heidi Pask ...  Herself - patient at age 12
Daniel Peterson M.D. ...  Himself - physician, Tahoe, NV
Jean Pollard ...  Herself - mother of a patient, Lyndonville, NY
William Reeves M.D. ...  Himself - CDC researcher
Peter Rowe M.D. ...  Himself - researcher at Johns Hopkins
Robert Shedd M.D. ...  Himself - Florida physician
Alexis Shelakov M.D. ...  Himself - researcher, Salk Institute
Dan Steinmeyer ...  Himself - former spokesperson, Incline Village
Maryan Wiedenfeld ...  Herself - sister of a patient
Leo Wotitzky ...  Himself - husband of a patient

Awards 

 WINNER, BEST DOCUMENTARY STARZ PEOPLES’ CHOICE AWARD, 2000, DENVER FILM FESTIVAL
 HONORABLE MENTION, GOLDEN STARFISH DOCUMENTARY AWARD, 2000, HAMPTONS FILM FESTIVAL
FIRST RUNNER UP, AUDIENCE AWARD BEST FEATURE, 2001, SARASOTA FILM FESTIVAL

See also 
 List of people with chronic fatigue syndrome

References

External links

Roger Ebert review of I Remember Me, December 7, 2001 
Ed Blank, Tribune-Review film critic, review of I Remember Me, November 7, 2001
Ken Fox, TV Guide, review of I Remember Me

American documentary films
Documentary films about people with disability
2000 films
2000 documentary films
Chronic fatigue syndrome
2000s American films